Macropodia czernjawskii is a species of marine crab in the family Inachidae, found in European waters.

References

Majoidea
Crustaceans described in 1880